Underground is a 1928 British silent drama film directed by Anthony Asquith and starring Brian Aherne, Elissa Landi, Cyril McLaglen, and Norah Baring. The film examines the lives of ordinary Londoners and the romance between them, set on and around the London Underground.

Plot
An electrician and a porter both fall in love with a shop girl they meet on the London Underground.

Cast
 Brian Aherne as Bill 
 Elissa Landi as Nell 
 Cyril McLaglen as  Bert, Power station worker 
 Norah Baring as Kate, Seamstress

Production
Underground was made by British Instructional Films at Elstree and Cricklewood Studios and on location in London including scenes shot at Lots Road Power Station in Chelsea. The film was based on an original scenario written by Asquith.

Restoration
Underground was restored in 2009 under the auspices of the British Film Institute (BFI). In 2011, composer and well-known silent film accompanist Neil Brand wrote a completely new score for the film, which was then premiered by the BBC Symphony Orchestra at the Barbican Centre in London.

References

Bibliography
 Ryall, Tom. Anthony Asquith. Manchester University Press, 2005.

External links
Underground at IMDB
Underground at BFI Database
 Sight & Sound article on Asquith's film
 Sight & Sound online review of the premiere of the BFI restoration
 Silent London article on Neil Brand's new score for Underground (with video clip)

1928 films
1928 drama films
British black-and-white films
Films directed by Anthony Asquith
British silent feature films
Films shot at British International Pictures Studios
Films set on the London Underground
Films set in London
British drama films
1920s English-language films
1920s British films
Silent drama films